The following is a sortable table of all songs by Beady Eye:

The column Song list the song title.
The column Writer(s) lists who wrote the song.
The column Album lists the album the song is featured on.
The column Producer lists the producer of the song.
The column Year lists the year in which the song was released.
The column Length list the length/duration of the song.

Studio recordings

References
 Footnotes
iTunes bonus tracks for Different Gear, Still Speeding.
Included on Different Gear, Still Speeding as Japanese bonus tracks.
Included on BE as Japanese bonus tracks.

Beady Eye